The yellow-billed nuthatch (Sitta solangiae) is a species of bird in the family Sittidae. It is found in Hainan, Laos, and Vietnam.

Its natural habitats are subtropical or tropical moist lowland forests and subtropical or tropical moist montane forests. It is threatened by habitat loss.

References

yellow-billed nuthatch
Birds of Hainan
Birds of Laos
Birds of Vietnam
yellow-billed nuthatch
yellow-billed nuthatch
Taxonomy articles created by Polbot